Andrew W. Tibbets (1830 – May 18, 1898) was an American soldier who fought in the American Civil War. Tibbets received his country's highest award for bravery during combat, the Medal of Honor. Tibbets medal was won for capturing the flag of the Confederate troop of Austin's Battery at Columbus, Georgia on April 16, 1865. He was honored with the award on June 17, 1865.

Tibetts was born in Clark County, Indiana, and entered service in Centerville, Iowa, and was buried in Allerton, Iowa.

Medal of Honor citation

See also
List of American Civil War Medal of Honor recipients: T–Z

References

1830 births
1898 deaths
American Civil War recipients of the Medal of Honor
Burials in Iowa
People of Iowa in the American Civil War
People from Clark County, Indiana
Union Army soldiers
United States Army Medal of Honor recipients
Date of birth unknown